Kraśnik Dolny  is a village in the administrative district of Gmina Bolesławiec, within Bolesławiec County, Lower Silesian Voivodeship, in western Poland, 400km away from Warsaw. Prior to 1945, the village was located within Germany. The village has an approximate population of 640.

The land around the town is very flat, being mostly wheat fields and other farmland. Kraśnik Dolny lies 175 metres above sea level. Around Kraśnik, there are about 65 people per square kilometre, being relatively sparsely populated. 

The climate is hemiboreal, with an average temperature of 8°C. The coldest month, January, has an average temperature of -6°C, with the warmest month, July, being 19°C.

References

Villages in Bolesławiec County